Oggi sposi (Just Married) is a 2009 Italian comedy film directed by Luca Lucini.

Cast
Luca Argentero as Nicola Impanato
Moran Atias as Alopa
Dario Bandiera as Salvatore Sciacca
Isabella Ragonese as Chiara Malagò
Carolina Crescentini as Giada
Filippo Nigro as Fabio Di Caio
Francesco Montanari as Attilio Panecci
Gabriella Pession as Sabrina Monti
Michele Placido as Sabino Impanato
Renato Pozzetto as Renato Di Caio
Lunetta Savino as Violetta Abbatescianni in Impanato
Hassani Shapi as Ambassador
Francesco Pannofino as Peppino Impanato
Caterina Guzzanti as poliziotta Ghedini

References

External links

2009 films
2009 comedy films
Italian comedy films
Films about weddings
Films directed by Luca Lucini
2000s Italian-language films